Lycostomus is a genus of beetles belonging to the family Lycidae.

The species of this genus are found in Eastern Asia and Northern America.

Species:

Lycostomus atrimembris 
Lycostomus crassus 
Lycostomus formosanus 
Lycostomus honestus 
Lycostomus maroniensis 
Lycostomus placidus 
Lycostomus similis

References

Lycidae